Tyler Ashley Roberts (born 4 November 2003) is a professional footballer who plays as a winger for Wolverhampton Wanderers. Born in England, he plays for the Jamaica national team.

Club career
Roberts is a youth product of Wolverhampton Wanderers since the age of 9. He worked his way up their youth sides, until signing his first professional contract with the club on 14 November 2021. In September 2021 he started training with their senior team, having played with their U21 and U23 sides.

International career
Roberts was born in England and is of Jamaican descent. He was called up to represent the Jamaica U20s for the 2022 CONCACAF U-20 Championship. He debuted for the senior Jamaica national team in a friendly 0–0 draw to Trinidad and Tobago on 14 March 2023.

References

External links
 

2003 births
Living people
Sportspeople from Walsall
Jamaican footballers
Jamaica international footballers
Jamaica youth international footballers
English footballers
Jamaican people of English descent
English sportspeople of Jamaican descent
Association football wingers
Wolverhampton Wanderers F.C. players